is a Filipino-Japanese footballer who most recently played for Davao Aguilas in the Philippines Football League. He previously playing for United Football League team Global. and the Philippines national football team.

International career
Otomo made his debut for the Philippines on November 9, 2014 in a friendly against Thailand in Nakhon Ratchasima as a substitute. He entered the pitch on half time.

Personal life
Otomo was born to a Japanese father and a Filipino mother. His mother hails from Zamboanga.

References

External links

 Official profile 

1981 births
Living people
Japanese footballers
J1 League players
J2 League players
Japan Football League players
Vegalta Sendai players
Sagan Tosu players
Yokohama FC players
Blaublitz Akita players
FC Gifu players
Tokyo Musashino United FC players
Japanese expatriate footballers
Expatriate footballers in Germany
Citizens of the Philippines through descent
Liga 1 (Indonesia) players
Bontang F.C. players
Persela Lamongan players
Persib Bandung players
Expatriate footballers in Indonesia
Japanese expatriate sportspeople in Germany
Japanese expatriate sportspeople in Indonesia
Filipino expatriate footballers
Filipino expatriate sportspeople in Germany
Filipino expatriate sportspeople in Indonesia
Expatriate footballers in Thailand
Filipino people of Japanese descent
Japanese people of Filipino descent
Global Makati F.C. players
Philippines international footballers
Filipino footballers
Association football people from Chiba Prefecture
Association football midfielders
Ayeyawady United F.C. players
JPV Marikina F.C. players